Saint Elizabeth North Eastern is a parliamentary constituency represented in the Parliament of Jamaica. It elects one Member of Parliament by the first past the post system of election. The constituency covers the north east part of Saint Elizabeth Parish. Until 2020 it was the only constituency in the parish, out of four, to be held by the PNP.

Representation

References 

Parliamentary constituencies of Jamaica